The Amils are a caste of Sindhis. The word "Amil" has its origin in the Persian word "amal" (as "administer"). Amils used to work in Administration in Government services. 

Amils and Bhaibands were the communities that were one of the earliest to take up English education during British colonial rule.   They were, along with the Parsis, the closest to the British and were regularly sent to Britain in order to seal business deals on behalf of the East India Company.

Amils in Sindh
Amongst Sindhi Hindus, socially this clan ranks first in the hierarchical ranking among followed by Bhaiband. The Amils held the highest administrative offices under Muslim rulers, beginning in the mid-eighteenth century. They speak Sindhi. In 1938, Amils were primarily  bankers, clerks, and minor officials . Amils are by no means the wealthiest in the Sindhi community but are highly educated professionals, often to this day.

Notable Amils include 
 LK Advani: Politician
 Ram Jethmalani (1923 – 2019): Lawyer and politician
 Niranjan Hiranandani: construction magnate
 Meera Sanyal: RBS chairman and AAP politician.
 Gulab Mohanlal Hiranandani: Indian Navy Officer
 Babita Kapoor: Actress Daughter of Hari Shivdasani|
 Hari Shivdasani : A prominent Bollywood Character actor
 Sadhna Shivdasani: Bollywood actress
 S.P Hinduja and Hinduja Family: Wealthiest Indian family in the United Kingdom.
 Kewalram Ratanmal Malkani : politician
 Ranveer Singh: Bollywood actor
 Nikhil Advani: Film Director
 Pankaj Advani: World Snooker Champion
 Disht Advani: M&A Consultant and Innovation Trainer at PwC Europe

References

 Bherumal Mahirchand Advani, "Amilan-jo-Ahwal" - published in Sindhi, 1919
 Amilan-jo-Ahwal (1919) - translated into English in 2016 ("A History of the Amils") at sindhis

Lohana
Social groups of Pakistan
Sindhi tribes
Sindhi tribes in India